Montagu(e) Bertie may refer to:

Montagu Bertie, 2nd Earl of Lindsey (1608–1666), English peer 
Montagu Bertie, 5th Earl of Abingdon (1784–1854), English peer
Montagu Bertie, 6th Earl of Abingdon (1808–1884), English peer and British politician
Montagu Bertie, 7th Earl of Abingdon (1836–1928), English peer
Montague Bertie, 11th Earl of Lindsey (1815–1899), English peer
Montague Bertie, 12th Earl of Lindsey (1861–1938), English peer

See also
Montagu Venables-Bertie, 2nd Earl of Abingdon (1673–1743), English peer
Montagu Towneley-Bertie, 13th Earl of Lindsey (1887–1963), English peer